I'm Solomon is a 1968 musical with music by Ernest Gold, lyrics by Anne Croswell, and book by Crowell and Dan Almagor.

The play was profiled in the William Goldman book The Season: A Candid Look at Broadway.

References

External links
 

1968 musicals
Broadway musicals